All provincial-level divisions of China are divided into prefectural-level divisions (second-level): prefectural-level cities, prefectures, autonomous prefectures and leagues. There are 333 prefecture level divisions in China as of January 2019.

Number of prefectures in each province 
 Note
 not shown in the list below
 [] special divisions

List 
 Note
 Municipalities (Beijing, Chongqing, Shanghai, & Tianjin) are not included but their internal divisions are similar as those of prefectures;
 Sub-prefecture-level cities are excluded;
 Sub-provincial cities are included, but other types of sub-provincial divisions are not;
 * Indicates capital of province.
 Bold Sub-provincial city or above.

Dissolved prefectures

Anhui

Chahar (1949-1952)

Fujian

Hebei

Heilongjiang

Inner Mongolia

Jiangsu

Jiangxi

Jilin

Liaodong (1949-1954)

Liaoning

Rehe (1949-1955)

Shandong

Shanxi

Songjiang (1949-1954)

Suiyuan (1949-1954)

Zhejiang

See also 

 Administrative divisions of China
 Sub-provincial divisions in China
 Prefecture-level city
 Provincial city
 Top prefecture-level cities by GDP
 Top prefecture-level cities by GDP per capita
 List of cities in China by population
 List of cities in China
 List of twin towns and sister cities in China
 List of capitals in China
 Sub-provincial divisions in Mainland China
 List of urban agglomerations in China
 Global city

Notes 

.
Prefectures
China 2